Aden Aw Hirsi (born 1978) is a Somali politician and author. The current Minister of State for Environment & Climate Change of Somalia, he previously served as the Minister of Planning & International Cooperation of Jubaland State among other different important portfolios.

Biography
Adam hails from the Marehan Reer Diini Sub clan. 
The great grandson of Sheikh Aw Hirsi, a well-known Qadiri Sufi leader, Aden Ibrahim Aw Hirsi, was born in 1978 in the southern Gedo region of Somalia. Aden was born to Hafitha Sheikh Ali and Ibrahim Moallim Guuleed Aw Hirsi in Sarinley neighborhood of Baardheere district in December. At the time of growing up, Sarinley was home to one of the best Koranic Schools in the country, Moallim Ahmed Sarmaaleh's Koranic School. Also, present in Sarinley is the tomb of Sayyid Warsame Jama of the Qadiriyah order of Sufism.

Education
He attended primary and secondary schools in Sarinley and Bardera. He spent a good part of his growing years in the Bardera District, where many of his family members and relatives have lived for generations.

Adam has a PhD in Social Sciences from Kenya Methodist University.

Career
Earlier in life Aden was intrigued by the dynamics of languages. He focused mainly on Tafseer (Quran Translationin Arabic) and English Books. A few years later, he began his translation and interpreting career while still a teenager and in high school. He continued performing interpreting and relief jobs through much of the late 1990s. In this capacity, he had worked for CARE International and UNHCR as a local staff, and later co-founded SADO, a local non-profit organization.

Between 2003 and 2006, Aden taught  English and Somali at Columbus State Community College in Columbus city of State of Ohio of The United States. In 2008, he cofounded SomaliCAN, an outreach and advocacy organization that provides services and information to Somalis in the United States of America and beyond.

Political career

In November 2006, he was chosen to become the governor of the Gedo region in Somalia. While in office, Governor Aw Hirsi, a former relief worker himself, persuaded numerous international relief organizations to open offices in the region. As a result, a number of disasters were averted. In the same year, Al-Shabaab, a local Islamist group unhappy with the presence of many foreign relief organizations in the region, declared its strong opposition to Aw Hirsi's popular administration. The group consequently orchestrated a peaceful way to frustrate and ultimately oust the governor by bankrolling Aw Hirsi's challenger, Hussein Ismail, the latter of whom then gathered a clan militia and threatened to start a civil war in the region.

In May 2008, faced with the dilemma of choosing between bloodshed and resignation from his gubernatorial post, Aw Hirsi resigned from office and enabled district-based local elections that would see Ismail assume governorship.

Since 2011, Aden has been a senior political adviser to Prime Ministers of Somalia, Dr. Abdi Farah Shirdon, Abdiweli Sheikh Ahmed Mohamed, Omar Abdirashid Sharmarke. Aw Hirsi resigned from Sharmarke's Office for unspecified reasons.

Aw Hirsi was appointed  the minister of Justice constitution and religious affairs of Jubbaland state of Somalia in May 2016. In his capacity as the Minister of Justice... Aw Hirsi has been vital and instrumental in the Somali national projects. He was the lead Jubaland person in Somalia elections 2016/17.

Literary career
As a writer, Aw Hirsi has authored numerous books and glossaries including:

Somali for Icebreaking, 2003
Queen Arraweloh's Mean Throne: Translation, 2001,
Things we Have in Common: Short Stories, 2003, and
The Somali Court Interpreter, 2005

Notes

Government ministers of Somalia
Somalian writers
Living people
1978 births
Kenya Methodist University alumni
Governors of Somalia